Hibino (written: 日比野 or 日美野) may refer to:

Surname
, Japanese voice actress
, Japanese model
, Japanese tennis player
, Japanese composer and saxophonist
, Japanese professional drifting driver

Other
Hibino, Japanese AV production company, member of SOD Group
Hibino Station:
Hibino Station (Aisai, Aichi), train station in Aisai, Aichi Prefecture, Japan
Hibino Station (Nagoya), train station in Nagoya City, Japan

Japanese-language surnames